BCM Olimpic Baia Mare was a professional basketball team from Baia Mare, Romania. The team played in the Liga Națională.

History
BCM Olimpic Baia Mare was founded in 2006 and in its short history the club played mainly in Liga I, Romanian second basketball league. In 2016 they finished on 2nd place and promoted to Liga Națională for the first time in their history.

Honours
 Liga I
Runners-up (1): 2016–2017

2016–2017 roster

References

External links
 Team profile on eurobasket 
 Official facebook page 
 Team profile on totalbaschet 
 profile on BaschetRomania

Baia Mare
Sport in Baia Mare
Defunct basketball teams in Romania
Basketball teams established in 2006
Basketball teams disestablished in 2017
2006 establishments in Romania
2017 disestablishments in Romania